Genesis Partners is an Israeli venture capital firm, founded in 1996 by Eddy Shalev and Eyal Kishon.

Overview
Genesis Partners investment strategy is focused on early-stage Israeli innovation-driven technology companies. The company invests in  communications & wireless technologies, infrastructure software & hardware, enterprise software, internet applications and services, digital media, consumer applications and services, mobile applications and services. Genesis has over $20 billion in assets under management and has invested in over 300 companies.

In 2011, Genesis Partners launched The Junction, Israel's first open house for entrepreneurs. Entrepreneurs who are selected to work on their venture at The Junction for six months, before ending their experience in a Demo Day to Israeli angel investors and venture capital firms.

The firm's partners include Eddy Shalev, Eyal Kishon, Gary Gannot, Jonathan Saacks and Hadar Kiriati.

In 2016, three members of the senior investment team, including Jonathan Saacks and Eddy Shalev, spun out with a seed stage fund, F2 Venture Capital, and took over management of The Junction. In 2019, Insight Venture Partners announced purchasing a majority of the portfolio of Genesis Partners fourth fund named Genesis Partners IV.

Portfolio companies

 Any.DO – Developer of task management mobile apps
 Aternity – User Experience Management solutions
 DaPulse – Social communication tool for improving the internal information-sharing processes within an organization (now renamed to Monday.com)
 Discretix – Security solutions for mobile devices and flash-based storage
 EatWith – community marketplace that invites people to dine in other homes
Homeis – social networking app for immigrants
Innovid
 JoyTunes
 Radwin – Broadband wireless connectivity solutions.
 Riskified – a company that reviews, approves and guarantees high risk credit card transactions for online merchants.
 Sckipio Technologies – A semiconductor company focused on the ITU standard, G.fast.
 Sisense – End-to-end business intelligence software
 SponDoolies –Tech build infrastructure technology for virtually mining cryptocurrency such as Bitcoin.
 Valens Semiconductor – Fabless manufacturing company providing semiconductor solutions for the development of HDBaseT devices.

Exits
 Allot Communications (IPO) – provider of IP service optimization solutions for service providers, carriers, and enterprises
 Appilog (acquired by Mercury Interactive) – application mapping technologies
 AudioCodes (IPO) – designs, develops, and sells advanced Voice over IP (VoIP) and converged VoIP and Data networking products and applications to service providers and enterprises
 Butterfly VLSI (acquired by Texas Instruments) – developed low cost chipsets that enabled RF wireless communications
 ClickSoftware Technologies (IPO) – develops software solutions for workforce optimization, allowing companies to efficiently coordinate the dispatch of field service technicians to customer locations
 ColBar LifeScience (acquired by Johnson & Johnson) – develops, manufactures, and commercializes biosurgical products
 Compugen (IPO) – develops and markets bioinformatics software platforms and engages in in silico drug discovery
eToro – a social trading and multi-asset brokerage company that focuses on providing financial and copy trading services
 FilesX (acquired by IBM) – storage software company that specializes in continuous data protection with near-instant recovery software for applications and data
 FIS Software – Software solution for the Insurance industry, acquired by Sapiens International Corporation
 Fundtech (IPO) – designs, develops, markets, and supports client/server products for electronic payments
Jeeng (formerly PowerInbox) – AI-powered autonomous marketing platform
 Kidaro (acquired by Microsoft) – provider of desktop virtualization solutions for enterprises
 Modem Art (acquired by Agere Systems) – developer of advanced processor technology for 3G/UMTS mobile devices
 Neebula Systems (acquired by ServiceNow) - business service monitoring (BSM) platform for virtualized data center environments
 Octalica (acquired by Broadcom) – home networking solutions over coaxial cable
 Optonol (acquired by Alcon) – devices for ophthalmologic applications
 PrimeSense developer of 3D sensing technology, acquired by Apple Inc. for $350 million on November 24, 2013.
 ProSight (acquired by Primavera) – enterprise IT portfolio management software
 Scopus Video Networks (IPO) – end-to-end digital video networking products 
 SolarEdge (IPO) – provides an intelligent inverter solution that has changed the way power is harvested and managed in solar photovoltaic systems 
 Wintegra (acquired by PMC-Sierra) – multiprotocol semiconductors for broadband access networks 
 Worklight (acquired by IBM) – Mobile application platform software 
 Yedda (acquired by AOL, renamed to AOL Answers) – community-driven question and answer service

See also
 Venture capital in Israel
 Silicon Wadi
 List of Israeli companies quoted on the Nasdaq
 List of multinationals with research and development centres in Israel

References

External links

Venture capital firms of Israel
Investment companies of Israel
Financial services companies established in 1996
1996 establishments in Israel